The Pioneers of Alaska is a fraternal organization that was founded in 1907 to preserve the early history of Alaska. 

Originally restricted to white males who entered Alaska before 1900, the organization today has about 5000 members, who must be residents of Alaska for at least 20 years to be eligible to join. Once led by men, women became eligible for all leadership positions in 2012.

Founded in Nome, Alaska, the organization works at "gathering and preserving the relics and early history of Alaska", and at improving its economic and social conditions.

The organization has 35 local chapters, which are called "igloos". The group operates the Pioneer Museum at Pioneer Park, in Fairbanks.

Noel Wien was made an honorary member of the northernmost chapter, Igloo No. 8, after successfully landing at Wiseman, Alaska on 5 May 1925.

See also
 Alaska Native Brotherhood

References

Further reading
 Chase, Will H. (1951). Pioneers of Alaska - The Trail Blazers of Bygone Days. Kansas City: Burton Publishing Company. 203 pp.

External links
Pioneers of Alaska - Grand Igloo

Organizations based in Alaska
Organizations established in 1907
Lineage societies
State based fraternal and lineage societies
1907 establishments in Alaska